Oh Mercy were an Australian indie rock band formed by Alexander Gow. The band released five studio albums, Privileged Woes (2009), Great Barrier Grief (2011), Deep Heat (2012), When We Talk About Love (2015) and Café Oblivion (2018). 

At the ARIA Music Awards of 2015 they won Best Adult Contemporary Album for When We Talk About Love.

History

Oh Mercy was an indie rock band, formed as a duo in Melbourne in 2006 by former De La Salle College students Alexander Gow on lead vocals and guitar, and Thomas Savage on lead vocals, piano and guitar. The band name is from Bob Dylan's September 1989 album of the same name. Their music has received high rotation on Australian national radio station, Triple J, since April 2007. Oh Mercy expanded to a quartet by 2008 with Eliza Lam on bass guitar and Peter McDonald on drums.

The quartet issued a six-track extended play, In the Nude for Love, in May 2009 which Electric Skeletons reviewer noticed the group "make the kind of dreamy pop music that even your Grandmother would probably appreciate (although they drop the f-bomb in 'Seems Like a Good Idea', so unless you have a really cool granny, perhaps not). It is very easy to see why they’ve been compared to the likes of The Go-Betweens and Augie March." The reviewer listed the EP as one of the best of that year, "Aside from the brilliant title it has some great pop songs and two instrumentals." Two tracks, "Lay Everything on Me" and "Seemed Like a Good Idea", were issued as singles and were used to promote the group on Triple J and Triple R.

The four-piece released their debut album, Privileged Woes, on 24 August 2009 on the Casadeldisco label and distributed by Shock with Myles Wootton (of the Panics) producing. Gow and Savage co-wrote all the tracks. Gow explained the album's content and title, "I realised the problems we had were the problems of privilege. We started poking fun at ourselves. It set the theme for the record. We were 19 and middle class and whingeing about emotions and angst coming out of being that age." Privileged Woes peaked at No. 3 on the ARIA Hitseekers Albums chart a week after its appearance.

In 2009 Rohan Sforcina joined on drums, after the album had been recorded with McDonald. In 2010 Savage left the group and later reflected on his songwriting partnership with Gow, "We'd show each other what we'd done that week and it would be like a friendly competition. It was great for early development." He had left after touring with the group for 18 months to return to Australia and pursued a solo singer-songwriter career. Gow remembered "Tom had flagged with everybody that he wanted to move on at some stage. It wasn't a big surprise for us. He was really not interested in the touring lifestyle." Simon Okely (ex-The Preytells) joined on guitar.

Their first three albums were each a featured album on Triple J.

The project is presumed to have ceased when lead Alex Gow changed the Facebook page for the band over to his new solo project, Perfect Moment, in April 2020.

Discography

Studio albums

Extended plays

Charted singles 

Notes

Awards and nominations

AIR Awards
The Australian Independent Record Awards (commonly known informally as AIR Awards) is an annual awards night to recognise, promote and celebrate the success of Australia's Independent Music sector.

|-
| AIR Awards of 2009
|Oh Mercy 
| Breakthrough Independent Artist
| 
|-
| AIR Awards of 2012
|"Drums"
| Best Independent Single/EP
| 
|-

AMP Award
The Australian Music Prize (The AMP) is an annual award of $30,000 given to an Australian band or solo artist in recognition of the merit of an album released during the year of award. The award made by Australian Music Prize Ltd, a sole-purpose entity sponsored by a variety of music industry figures and record companies. The AMP was established in 2005.

|-
| 2009
|Kid Sam
| Australian Music Prize
| 
|-

ARIA Music Awards

The ARIA Music Awards are an annual series of ceremonies celebrating the local industry, presented by the Australian Recording Industry Association (ARIA), since 1987. Oh Mercy have won one trophy from five final nominations.

|-
| rowspan="2"| 2011 || Great Barrier Grief || Breakthrough Artist – Album  ||  
|-
| Great Barrier Grief – Ken Done || Best Cover Art ||  
|-
| rowspan="2"| 2012 ||Deep Heat || Best Rock Album ||  
|-
| Deep Heat – Rennie Ellis || Best Cover Art ||  
|-
| 2015 || When We Talk About Love || Best Adult Contemporary Album ||

EG Awards / Music Victoria Awards
The EG Awards (known as Music Victoria Awards since 2013) are an annual awards night celebrating Victorian music. They commenced in 2006.

|-
| rowspan="4"|EG Awards of 2012||Oh Mercy||Best Band||
|-
| "Drums" || Best Song||
|-
| Deep Heat || Best Album ||
|-
| Oh Mercy || Outstanding Achievement||

J Award
The J Awards are an annual series of Australian music awards that were established by the Australian Broadcasting Corporation's youth-focused radio station Triple J. They commenced in 2005.

|-
| J Awards of 2009
| Privileged Woes
| Australian Album of the Year
| 
|-
| J Awards of 2012
| Deep Heat
| Australian Album of the Year
| 
|-

Band members

Alexander Gow – lead vocals, guitar, piano (2006–present)
Thom Savage – lead vocals, piano, guitar (2006–10)
 Peter McDonald – drums (2008–09)
Eliza Lam – bass guitar (2008–present)
Rohan Sforcina – drums (2009–present)
Simon Okely – lead guitar
Annabel Griggs (touring keys)
Cliff Bowden (touring guitar)

See also
 Music of Melbourne
 Music of Australia
 Australian Independent Record Labels Association (AIR)

References

External links

 

ARIA Award winners
Victoria (Australia) musical groups